Oskar Reichert (July 27, 1900 – October 1970) was an American architect. His work was part of the architecture event in the art competition at the 1936 Summer Olympics.

References

1900 births
1970 deaths
20th-century American architects
Olympic competitors in art competitions
Architects from Frankfurt